Peter Gunnar Karlsson (born 18 December 1969) is a former motorcycle speedway rider from Sweden, who was twice Swedish champion and a three times World Cup winner.

Career
Karlsson first rode for Wolverhampton Wolves in Britain during the 1990 season.

He won the Swedish Pairs Championship twice with brother Mikael Max, in 1992 and 1996 and was the Swedish Individual Champion in 1989 and 1991.

In October 2000, during the Speedway Grand Prix Qualification he won the GP Challenge, which ensured that he claimed a permanent slot for the 2001 Grand Prix.

He is a legend at parent club Wolverhampton where he helped them win the 2009 Elite League title despite suffering with a broken collarbone two weeks prior to the play off final. Due to the average points limit, PK had to move on in 2010 and joined Belle Vue Aces on loan.

In 2016, PK wasn't originally in Wolverhampton's plans but after Mikel Beck pulled out of the team leaving the door open for PK to join back. He accepted and joined for the remainder of the season. He would later play a huge role as the 2016 team beat Belle Vue over 2 legs in the Elite League final. After the Belle Vue meeting he announced his retirement from British Speedway.

Family
His two younger brothers, Mikael Max and Magnus Karlsson were both motorcycle speedway riders. All three brothers represented Sweden in the 2007 Speedway World Cup, with Magnus riding at reserve.

Career Achievements
 World Under-21 Finalist (1989, 1990)
 Swedish Champion (1989, 1991)
 World Finalist (1993)
 Speedway Grand Prix Rider (1995, 1996, 1997, 1999, 2000, 2001)
 Swedish GP Wildcard (1998, 2002, 2003)
 Polish GP Wildcard (2003)
 Speedway World Team Cup Champion (2000)
 Speedway World Cup Champion (2003, 2004)
 Slovenian GP Wildcard (2003)
 Czech GP Wildcard (2003)
 European GP Wildcard (2003)
 Norwegian GP Wildcard (2003)
 Scandinavian GP Wildcard (2004, 2007)
 German GP Wildcard (2007)
 Swedish Finalist (2008)

World Final Appearances
 1993 -  Pocking, Rottalstadion - 8th - 8pts

Speedway Grand Prix results

See also
 Sweden national speedway team
 List of Speedway Grand Prix riders

References

People from Gullspång Municipality
1969 births
Living people
Swedish speedway riders
Speedway World Cup champions
Polonia Bydgoszcz riders
Wolverhampton Wolves riders
Peterborough Panthers riders
Belle Vue Aces riders
King's Lynn Stars riders
Lakeside Hammers riders
Swedish expatriates in Poland
Expatriate speedway riders in Poland
Sportspeople from Västra Götaland County